Qemal bej Mullai (1882 - 1966) was a 20th-century Albanian politician. He was one of the signatories of the Albanian Declaration of Independence.

References

Albanians from the Ottoman Empire
Signatories of the Albanian Declaration of Independence
1882 births
1966 deaths
All-Albanian Congress delegates
People from Berat